The IndyCar Series hosts two races a year on the combined road course at the Indianapolis Motor Speedway in Speedway, Indiana. The first, the GMR Grand Prix is held in early May with an inaugural running in 2014. The second race, the Gallagher Grand Prix is held in the summer as a support race for the NASCAR Cup Series Verizon 200 at the Brickyard and was first run in 2020.

The race is run on a newer, modified layout of the circuit previously used for the Formula One United States Grand Prix, and later the Moto GP motorcycle event.

The GMR Grand Prix serves as a lead-in to the Indianapolis 500. Support races are held, including Indy Lights, Pro Mazda and U.S. F2000. From 2014 to 2016, the race was known as the Grand Prix of Indianapolis, and from 2015 to 2016 it was sponsored by Angie's List. For 2017, the Angie's List title sponsorship was dropped, and the race name was changed to the IndyCar Grand Prix. This was done in order to reduce confusion with the previous Formula One grand prix race that used to be held there, and to emphasize to fans that the race was part of the American-based IndyCar Series.

Background

In 2012, Hulman & Co., then parent company of the Indianapolis Motor Speedway, hired Boston Consulting Group to evaluate its business operations. In their report, one of their suggestions was to explore the possibility of hosting an IndyCar Series race on the road course at Indy. The modern FIA Grade One infield road course had opened in 2000, and was initially used for the United States Grand Prix from 2000 to 2007. Later, it was used for Moto GP, and Grand Am. The layout for the infield road course was originally designed in 1992 by Kevin Forbes during the reconstruction of the Brickyard Crossing golf course. It had already gone through some various improvements, most notably in 2008 when the "Snake Pit" segment was added in the infield of oval turn one. Indy cars had never raced on the road course layout, sticking only to the oval circuit for the Indianapolis 500, but their support series, the Indy Lights, had raced there four times. Occasionally Indy cars used the Indianapolis road course as a test facility, since many teams are headquartered in the Indianapolis area. Dan Wheldon notably tested the DW12 chassis at the course in September 2011.

In September 2013, an IndyCar feasibility test was conducted on the Indianapolis Motor Speedway road course. The test yielded positive results. Speculation immediately began to grow about a possible race for 2014, either as a May "doubleheader" event with the Indy 500, or a stand-alone race in the fall. The inaugural race was announced on October 1, 2013, and was scheduled for early May. The decision was made to utilize the course in a clockwise layout, and to re-work certain parts of the track.

Course changes
In October 2013, a construction project began to reconfigure the road course layout in order to the make the circuit more competitive, better for fans, and more suited for Indy cars. The entire road course portion was repaved, while several segments were modified. Corner one of road course was changed to a 90-degree turn with a raised curb on the inside. The road course portion inside oval turn four was revised to bypass two slow turns, and effectively lengthened the Hulman Boulevard backstretch. At the end of the Hulman Blvd. backstretch, a new 90-degree left corner leads to a new series of faster turns behind the Museum. Rather than follow original corner 13 (oval turn 1) like the U.S. Grand Prix did, the IndyCar circuit mimics the motorcycle course, and utilized the "Snake Pit" infield complex. Two of the tighter, sharper, corners (utilized by the motorcycles) were bypassed and replaced with a single 90-degree right turn leading to the pit entry. The new course distance measures 2.439 miles (3.925 km).

Schedule
From 2014 to 2019, and again since 2021, the IndyCar Grand Prix has been scheduled for the Saturday two weeks before the Indianapolis 500. The race effectively serves as an "opening weekend" for the month of May activities at the Speedway. The race is on the Saturday that was once used for Indy 500 pole day (1952–1997 & 2001–2009), and in other years the opening day of practice (1998–2000 & 2010–2013).

Saturday was selected for the race due to the fact that the Sunday two weeks before the Indy 500 is usually Mother's Day (a day usually avoided by motorsports). In addition, the track is closed on Sunday to allow crews to convert the track back to the oval layout, and to allow teams to convert their cars from road course to oval configuration. Practice for the Indy 500 on the oval begins the following day on Monday or Tuesday.

On April 6, 2020, the IndyCar Series announced that as part of revisions to the 2020 season due to the COVID-19 pandemic, it would add a third event at the Indianapolis Motor Speedway to the schedule known as the IndyCar Harvest GP on the road course. Later, it was expanded to become a doubleheader on October 2–3. Its naming pays tribute to the Harvest Auto Racing Classic, and served as a support event accompanying the inaugural Indianapolis 8 Hour of the Intercontinental GT Challenge circuit. It was the second road course race at IMS for the 2020 season, alongside the GMR Grand Prix (which was moved to July 4 as part of NASCAR's Brickyard 400 weekend).

For 2021, the GMR Grand Prix moved back to its normal date in early May, with the pandemic-induced meeting held during the NASCAR Verizon 200 weekend continuing.  During the NASCAR weekend, the race is an early afternoon Saturday event with the NASCAR Xfinity Shell 150 as the nightcap.  Big Machine Spiked Coolers sponsored the first event.

On April 29, 2022, the Arthur J. Gallagher & Co. was named sponsor of the summer race.

Past winners

IndyCar Series

May

Notes
 2022: Race delayed by approx. 45 minutes due to lightning and shortened due to two-hour time limit.

Summer

Intercontinental GT Challenge Weekend (Harvest GP)

Support race winners

 

2015: Three races were held in 2015. Due to severe weather at the NOLA race, that event was cancelled. The race was made up and moved to Indianapolis, utilizing the same grid.
2020: Due to the logistics of attempting to hold the Road to Indy (USF2000 and Pro 2000) events on the NASCAR Brickyard weekend, following the cancellation of the traditional May meeting caused by the COVID-19 pandemic, the event was moved to a stand-alone date in September. Indy Lights was not held as the series did not compete in 2020.

Race summaries

2014 

The month of May at Indianapolis opened with the Inaugural Grand Prix of Indianapolis on the Speedway's road course. With the field lined up for a standing start, polesitter Sebastián Saavedra's car stalled. A huge crash resulted, involving Saavedra, Carlos Muñoz, and Mikhail Aleshin, showering debris along the frontstretch and into the pit area.

Late in the race, Simon Pagenaud led Ryan Hunter-Reay. Both drivers were low on fuel, and trying to nurse their cars to the finish. Hélio Castroneves, who had pitted for fuel, was charging through the field, and looking to run down the leaders. Pagenaud held off the challenge, and crossed the finish line just ahead of Hunter-Reay and Castroneves. Pagenaud's car ran out of fuel on the cool down lap.  Series rookie Jack Hawksworth, who earned his first front-row start, led a field-high 31 laps and finished seventh.

2015 
Will Power won the pole position for the second annual Angie's List Grand Prix of Indianapolis, continuing a dominating trend in 2015 for Penske Racing during qualifying. Penske cars qualified first, third, fourth, and fifth, with Ganassi's Scott Dixon (2nd) situated on the outside of the front row.

At the start, a multi-car tangle in turn one saw Scott Dixon spin out in front of the entire field. Hélio Castroneves (in his milestone 300th Indy car start) was involved in contact, as was Josef Newgarden, and others. Will Power took the lead and dominated the race, leading 65 of 82 laps. Power became the fifth different winner in as many races for 2015.

For the second race in a row, Graham Rahal had a spirited run to finish second. After the final round of pit stops, Rahal was able to close within two seconds of the lead, but was unable to catch Power in the final few laps. The races was slowed for only one yellow to clean up the incident on lap 1.

2016 
Simon Pagenaud became the first two-time winner of the Angie's List Grand Prix of Indianapolis. Pagenaud started from the pole position and led 57 of the 82 laps. After a caution came out on lap 38, Conor Daly came to the lead for a total of 14 laps while the field was cycling through different pit stop strategies. On the final series of pit stops, Pagenaud executed a very fast in-lap and out-lap, including a lightning fast 6.7-second pit stop. He emerged as the leader, and led the final 14 laps to victory. Cold temperatures and cloudy, windy conditions made for one of the coldest Indy car races in Speedway history.

It was Team Penske's second consecutive win in the Grand Prix, and 18th overall win at Indy.

2017 
Will Power started from the pole position and led 61 of 85 laps en route to victory. The race went the entire distance caution free. Hélio Castroneves led 24 laps, but slipped to fifth at the finish after their tire strategy did not work out favorably. After his final pit stop, Castroneves slipped from second to fifth in the waning laps on the primary black tires, while all the other leaders were on the option red tires.

2018 
Will Power won the IndyCar Grand Prix for the second year in a row, and third time overall. Power started on the pole position and led 56 of the 85 laps. Power chased down leader Robert Wickens to take the lead on lap 51 with a daring pass on the outside of turn one. When a full-course caution came out on lap 56 due to a spin by Josef Newgarden, all the leaders headed to the pits for their final pit stops. Power edged Wickens to the blend line by about two feet, to be the lead out of the pits. Powers held off Scott Dixon and Wickens for the victory.

Power's victory was the milestone 200th Indy car victory for Penske Racing, and two weeks later, Power would sweep the month by winning the Indianapolis 500.

2019 
In wet and rainy conditions, Simon Pagenaud won the IndyCar Grand Prix for the third time, and matching Will Power's accomplishment from a year earlier, swept the month of May by winning the Indianapolis 500 two weeks later. Pagenaud charged from sixth place to first over the final 18 laps. With two laps to go, race leader Scott Dixon led Pagenaud as they approached the end of the Hulman Boulevard backstretch. Dixon slid a little wide in turn 7, and Pagenaud took the lead in turns 8–9. Pagenaud pulled out to a two-second victory.

2020 (NASCAR Weekend) 
Due to the COVID-19 pandemic, the GMR Grand Prix was moved from its traditional May date to July 4 weekend. It became part of the NASCAR Big Machine Hand Sanitizer 400 weekend, and was part of a doubleheader on Saturday with the Pennzoil 150 of the Xfinity Series. Scott Dixon dominated the race, running away from the field after a full-course caution shuffled the standings on lap 36. Dixon had made his second pit stop under green on lap 33, but three laps later Oliver Askew crashed hard in turn 14. The leaders subsequently pitted under the caution, allowing Dixon to cycle up to the front of the pack. After the green came back out, Dixon chased down leader Graham Rahal and took the lead on lap 48. Despite Rahal only making two pit stops - compared to three by Dixon - Dixon was able to cruise over the final twenty laps, and he won by 19.9469 seconds. It was Dixon's first victory (after three second places) in the GMR Grand Prix, and Dixon's first victory at the Indianapolis Motor Speedway since winning the 2008 Indianapolis 500.

2020 (Intercontinental GT Weekend - two races)  

Also because of the pandemic, and race cancellations, two races were added as part of the Intercontinental GT Challenge weekend 8 Hours of Indianapolis in October, and the first race meeting of the season open to spectators.  The first race of the Harvest GP doubleheader was held on Friday October 2. The race was scheduled for 85 laps, and rookie Rinus VeeKay won the pole position. Colton Herta grabbed the lead on the first lap from the third starting position. VeeKay was able to take the lead on lap 7, then led the next 15 laps. Later in the race, Herta was back in the lead with Josef Newgarden chasing him down. Going into turn one on lap 60, Newgarden made a decisive pass, and Herta locked up the tires and overshot the turn. The leaders then made their final pits stops, with Newgarden coming back out as the leader. Newgarden led the final 25 laps to victory, and was able to close the gap in the championship hunt as points leader Scott Dixon managed only a ninth-place result.

The second race of the Harvest GP doubleheader was held on Saturday October 3. The race was scheduled for 75 laps (down from 85 laps on Friday). Will Power stated from the pole position and led all 75 laps, scoring his fourth win on the Indianapolis Motor Speedway road course. Power took the lead as the start, and pulled out to comfortable lead. After the final round of pit stops, Alexander Rossi and Colton Herta were battling for second place. Herta passed Rossi, then set his sights on power. With Power's tires starting to go away, Herta closed the gap to less than half a second. Power held on to win by only 0.8932 seconds in the caution-free event.

History

The addition of the Grand Prix of Indianapolis established two Indy car races in the Indianapolis area. It was the first time since 1970 that multiple Championship/Indy car races are being held in the greater Indianapolis area. Through 1970, the Indy 500 was accompanied by the Hoosier Hundred at the Indiana State Fairgrounds, which at the time was a National Championship event. The Hoosier Grand Prix at Indianapolis Raceway Park was held as a USAC Champ Car race from 1965 to 1970.

When the Indianapolis Motor Speedway was under construction in 1909, the original plans included a combined road course layout. This would have allowed for both oval track and road course events. It is believed that some initial grading was completed for what would have been a 5-mile layout, but plans for the road course were scrapped during construction. It was not until 1998 that plans for a road course layout at the facility were revived, when the United States Grand Prix was announced.

In 1990, a street circuit in downtown Indianapolis was proposed, with a goal of attracting a Formula One or CART Indy car race. The layout encompassed roads near the Hoosier Dome and Indianapolis Zoo. The plan never materialized.

The 2020 season marked four races were held in Indianapolis, with the three road course events –one during the NASCAR and two during the Intercontinental GT Challenge meeting– as a result of pandemic-related postponements.  For 2021, the two races are held during the Month of May and the NASCAR weekend.

References

External links
 

2014 establishments in Indiana
Auto races in the United States
IndyCar Series races
GMR Grand Prix
Motorsport in Indianapolis
Recurring sporting events established in 2014